Holger Stanislawski (born 26 September 1969) is a German football manager and former player.

Managerial career

FC St. Pauli
Stanislawski became interim manager of FC St. Pauli on 22 November 2006 after Andreas Bergmann was sacked by the club. André Trulsen became the new manager, ending Stanislawski's reign as interim manager. Stanislawski returned as manager on 27 June 2008 after spending time in Cologne getting his coaching certificate. Stanislawski left at the end of the 2010–11 season in order to manage 1899 Hoffenheim. Stanislawski spent 18 years at FC St. Pauli.

1899 Hoffenheim
On 19 April 2011, 1899 Hoffenheim announced he would become their new manager when the new season started. On 9 February 2012, he left Hoffenheim after having his contract terminated by club advisory board.

1. FC Köln
Stanislawski was hired as the new coach for 1. FC Köln on 14 May 2012. Stanislawski had his contract terminated with his final match on 19 May 2013 against FC Ingolstadt 04.

Career statistics

References

External links
 

1969 births
Living people
Footballers from Hamburg
German footballers
Association football defenders
Bundesliga players
2. Bundesliga players
SC Concordia von 1907 players
Hamburger SV II players
FC St. Pauli players
German football managers
FC St. Pauli managers
TSG 1899 Hoffenheim managers
1. FC Köln managers
2. Bundesliga managers